Sourcing may refer to:

Open-sourcing, the act of releasing previously proprietary software under an open source/free software license
Journalism sourcing, the practice of identifying a person or publication that gives information
Power sourcing equipment, network devices that will provide power in a Power over Ethernet (PoE) setup
Single sourcing, the reuse of content in publishing
Sourcing (personnel), the practice of recruiting talent
Procurement, the sourcing and acquisition of goods or services

See also
Outsourcing
Source (disambiguation)